Brien Thomas "B. T." Collins (October 17, 1940 – March 19, 1993) was an American politician from California and a member of the Republican party.

Early years
Born in New York City, Collins served as a Green Beret Captain during the Vietnam War and lost his right arm and right leg to a grenade attack in 1967.  Upon returning to the United States, Collins enrolled at Santa Clara University, earning a B.A. in 1970 and a J.D. in 1973.

Executive branch
In 1981, Collins was appointed by Democratic Governor Jerry Brown as Director of the California Conservation Corps.  During his California Conservation Corps service, Collins gained notoriety for drinking a beaker of malathion to demonstrate his belief that it was safe.

Although a Democrat, Brown nevertheless appointed the conservative Republican Collins to replace Gray Davis as his chief of staff, a position Collins held until Brown left office in 1983.

Collins served as chief deputy to Republican California State Treasurer Tom Hayes from 1989 until 1991, when Hayes left office and Republican Governor Pete Wilson appointed him as director of the California Youth Authority.

State Assembly
After Sacramento-area Republican Tim Leslie won a special election to the California State Senate to replace John Doolittle, who had been elected to Congress, Wilson encouraged Collins to run for Leslie's vacant seat in the State Assembly.  Collins won a special election that September for the Sacramento-area 5th District against fellow Republican Barbara Alby, and narrowly beat her again in the 1992 GOP primary.

Death
Collins died of a sudden heart attack March 19, 1993 in Sacramento while serving his second term in the State Assembly. Alby won the special election to replace him.

Several sites in Sacramento have been named in his honor, including the BT Collins Juvenile Justice Center in Sacramento. When the Sacramento Army Depot was redesignated as an Army Reserve Center in the mid-1990s, it was renamed the B.T. Collins Army Reserve Center.

There is also a park in the City of Folsom named the B.T. Collins City Park located at 828 Willow Creek Drive, Folsom, California. The men's restroom in the Santa Clara University School of Law library was named the "B.T. Collins Memorial Latrine" in his honor; it features a plaque over the urinal with a quote from Collins: "If it ain't in Gilbert's, it ain't the Law."

Electoral history

References

Further reading

External links

 B.T. Collins candidate information at JoinCalifornia.com
 B.T. Collins Scholarship official site
 B.T. Collins "Captain Hook" Scholarship at Santa Clara University School of Law
  
 B.T. Collins remembered on 25th Anniversary of his passing at KFBK (AM)

20th-century American politicians
Republican Party members of the California State Assembly
Jerry Brown
Chiefs of staff to United States state governors
American politicians with disabilities
American amputees
United States Army personnel of the Vietnam War
Members of the United States Army Special Forces
United States Army officers
Santa Clara University alumni
1993 deaths
1940 births